Arthur L. Padrutt (September 26, 1917 – April 4, 1992) was a politician in Wisconsin.

Biography
Padrutt was born on September 26, 1917, in Huron, South Dakota. He later moved to Chippewa Falls, Wisconsin.

Career
Padrutt was a member of the Wisconsin State Assembly from 1943 to 1944. He was elected to the Wisconsin State Senate in 1948 and was re-elected in 1952. In 1953, he was a candidate for the United States House of Representatives from Wisconsin's 9th congressional district in a special election following the death of Merlin Hull. He lost to Lester Johnson. Additionally, Padrutt was a public service commissioner. He was a Republican. He attended the University of Wisconsin-Eau Claire.

References

External links

1917 births
1992 deaths
People from Beadle County, South Dakota
Politicians from Chippewa Falls, Wisconsin
Republican Party Wisconsin state senators
Republican Party members of the Wisconsin State Assembly
University of Wisconsin–Eau Claire alumni
20th-century American politicians